Jaganathan Tyagaraja (born 18 October 1895) was a Ceylon Tamil barrister, politician and member of the State Council of Ceylon.

Tyagaraja was born on 18 October 1895. He was the son of Namasivayam Tyagaraja, a wealthy landed proprietor from Colombo, the capital of Ceylon. Tyagaraja was educated at Royal College, Colombo. After school he joined Christ's College, Cambridge, graduating with LLB and master's degrees. He was subsequently called to the bar.

Tyagaraja tried unsuccessfully to obtain a seat on the Legislative Council of Ceylon following the death of P. Ramanathan. He abided by the Jaffna Youth Congress' call to boycott the 1931 State Council election. The following year most of the Tamil politicians who had boycotted the election, including Tyagaraja, condemned the boycott.

Tyagaraja contested the 1944 State Council by-election as a candidate in Mannar-Mullaitivu and was elected to the State Council of Ceylon. Tyagaraja supported G. G. Ponnambalam's call for balanced representation in the Ceylonese legislature but nevertheless voted for self-government as recommended by the Soulbury Commission.

Tyagaraja contested the 1947 parliamentary election as a United National Party candidate in Mannar but was defeated by C. Sittampalam. His defeat has been attributed to his support for the Soulbury Constitution.

Tyagaraja played a key role in the establishment of the Central Bank of Ceylon and was an appointed member of its monetary board for 21 years (1950–71).

Electoral history

References

1895 births
Alumni of Christ's College, Cambridge
Alumni of Royal College, Colombo
Members of the 2nd State Council of Ceylon
People from Colombo
People from British Ceylon
Sri Lankan barristers
Sri Lankan Tamil lawyers
Sri Lankan Tamil politicians
United National Party politicians
Year of death missing